Gmina Września is an urban-rural gmina (administrative district) in Września County, Greater Poland Voivodeship, in west-central Poland.

Villages
Apart from the town of Września, Gmina Września contains the villages and settlements of Bardo, Białężyce, Bierzglin, Bierzglinek, Broniszewo, Chocicza Mała, Chocicza Wielka, Chociczka, Chwalibogowo, Czachrowo, Dębina, Gonice, Goniczki, Gozdowo, Gozdowo-Młyn, Grzybowo, Grzymysławice, Gulczewko, Gulczewo, Gutowo Małe, Gutowo Wielkie, Kaczanowo, Kawęczyn, Kleparz, Marzelewo, Marzenin, Nadarzyce, Neryngowo, Noskowo, Nowa Wieś Królewska, Nowy Folwark, Obłaczkowo, Osowo, Ostrowo Szlacheckie, Otoczna, Przyborki, Psary Małe, Psary Polskie, Psary Wielkie, Radomice, Sędziwojewo, Słomówko, Słomowo, Sobiesiernie, Sokołówko, Sokołowo, Sołeczno, Stanisławowo, Strzyżewo, Węgierki, Wódki and Żerniki.

Neighbouring gminas
Gmina Września is bordered by the gminas of Czerniejewo, Dominowo, Kołaczkowo, Miłosław, Nekla, Niechanowo, Strzałkowo and Witkowo.

Demographics

According to the 2012 Census:

References

 
Wrzesnia